Marlon Fernández (born August 24, 1977, in Cuba) is a Cuban singer, better known as the winner of the third season of Objetivo Fama, a Puerto Rican reality-show -singing talent contest broadcast by Univision Puerto Rico, and Telefutura network in the United States.

Biography
Marlon Fernández was born in La Lisa, Cuba in 1977 to José and Raquel Fernández. At the age of 14, he formed a five-piece band that would help him in his future career.

In 2001, he had an accident that threatened his right leg and moved to Tenerife, Canary Islands for treatment. During his stay there, he participated and won in a talent competition called El Concurso de la Juventud. He followed the competition by performing at several clubs and restaurants in Spain. In 2003, he moved to Miami, Florida where he started singing at several venues, including Mango's restaurant, with his band called La Química.

In 2005, he auditioned to participate in the third season of Objetivo Fama. During the show, he excelled with his interpretations and ended up winning getting over a million votes on the final night.

On October 24, 2006, he released his debut album titled Mi Sueño by Univision Records which peaked at #7 on Billboard'''s Latin Tropical chart. Marlon's first single was a cover of Willie Colón & Celia Cruz's hit "Usted Abusó", which he released alongside La India. The latter has always been Fernández's idol, and they met during the contest. The single peaked in the Top 10 in the Tropical Airplay Charts.

In January 2007, Marlon asked to be released from Univision Music Group. He was unsatisfied with how they were managing his career.

In 2007, he was nominated for a Billboard Latin Music Award for the Best Tropical Album. He was also nominated for two Lo Nuestro Awards. He also had a successful presentation at the Calle 8 Festival with Cachao López.

In January 2008, Marlon released a tribute to Dominican singer Juan Luis Guerra titled Homenaje a Juan Luis Guerra.

In 2009, Marlon released Estoy de Pie''. The lead single, "Hagamoslo Aunque Duela" reached #1 on the Tropical Airplay charts.

Personal life

Marlon has been married for more than 10 years with Daysel Miró. He currently resides in Puerto Rico.

Discography

References

External links
Marlon on Univision.com
Marlon's Old Page

1977 births
Living people
Cuban male singers
Cuban musicians
Salsa musicians